The Pitt Scholarship at the University of Cambridge was instituted in 1814 using surplus funds originally raised to erect a statue to William Pitt the Younger, supplemented with a donation from the Pitt Club in London. It became the pre-eminent classics University Scholarship of Great Britain.

References

Awards and prizes of the University of Cambridge
Scholarships in the United Kingdom